The VAL 208 is one of the VAL series, an automated guideway transit system developed by Matra and Siemens. The vehicles are manufactured at Siemens SGP (Simmering-Graz-Pauker) in Vienna, Austria.

It has been adopted by multiple railway operators since 2000.

In the successor to VAL 206, the system is compatible with VAL 206. Normally, automatic operation is performed, but it is possible for the driver to manually operate as necessary.

Overview 
Because of automatic operation, the delay is small, the train density can be increased. On the other hand, since this train is basically a two-car train, it is suitable for low-population areas and medium-sized cities.

Interior 
Although the vehicle is small, the window is large, so it is a car with open feeling. According to the climate of Europe, although air conditioning is not installed in the basic specification, air conditioning is installed only in the Uijeongbu Light Rail Transit train at South Korea.

Plastics are widely used for many parts, but doors and handrail are made of stainless steel.

The color tone inside the car varies depending on the railway operator.

Traction equipments 

The traction control system equips Low-voltage IGBT VVVF control.

The traction motor adopted Alstom's brushless DC motor. The traction motor was self-ventilated, mounted on bogie. It is mounted inside each wheel, and the power from the traction motor is transmitted via the planetary gear and the Cardan joint mechanism.

VAL208NG 
A minor change has been done several times in VAL 208, and a major change in specification was made in VAL 208 NG which is a minor change car in 2006. Specific changes are as follows.

 Abolition of VAL 208 logo
 Abolition of the Matra logo that was on the door
 Reduction of noise by reviewing traction motor specifications
 Change of structure of the door
 Weight saving

Use of the VAL208

References 

 フランス語版ページ
 THE VAL - TSD.ORG
 Villamos hajtásrendszerek – Az Alstom PMM alkalmazásai - Alstom
Electric multiple units of France
Electric railcars and multiple units of Italy
Electric multiple units of South Korea
Siemens multiple units
750 V DC multiple units